Women Medical and Dental College Abbottabad (WM&DC) (Urdu, Pashto, Hindko: ویمن میڈیکل اینڈ ڈینٹل کالج ایبٹ آباد) is situated in the city of Abbottabad District, Khyber Pakhtunkhwa, Pakistan.

Hostels 
Hostel system of WM&DC is designed to provide a supportive environment that feeds like home while helping students grow both academically and personally. Essential facilities include bed, mattress, study table, curtains, and cupboard for each student. Three meals with variety menus for everyday are included. Students who want to cook their own meals, stoves facility is provided. Hostel is staffed with wardens, cooks, bearers, guards and cleaners. Along with the aforementioned, hostels have additional housekeepers, washer women and attach bathrooms. Rooms are cleaned on daily basis.

Transport 
The college transport system consists of buses, coasters and vans. They are used to transport students to the college from hostels and also to the Benazir Bhutto Shaheed Teaching Hospital (Ex-DHQ), Rehmat Memorial Post Graduate Dental Hospital (RMPGDH), and to the rural areas to conduct medical camps.

Administration

Admission

Sports

Student societies 

 Women-MUN
 Environmental Protection Society
 Character Building Society
 Women Adventure Clubs
 Women Sports Society
 Women Islamic Society
 Women Blood Donor Society
 Women Debating Society
 Women Literary Society

Life at WM&DC

References 

Universities and colleges in Khyber Pakhtunkhwa
Khyber Medical University
Medical colleges in Khyber Pakhtunkhwa
1999 establishments in Pakistan
Educational institutions established in 1999
Abbottabad District
Women's universities and colleges in Pakistan